Sam Fisher is a fictional character and the protagonist of the Tom Clancy's Splinter Cell series of video games developed by Ubisoft as well as a series of tie-in novels. He was created by the writer JT Petty and designed by artist Martin Caya.

Fisher was originally voiced by veteran actor Michael Ironside in the first five installments of the series. In 2013, Eric Johnson assumed the voice and physical role in Tom Clancy's Splinter Cell: Blacklist. Ironside later returned to the role in 2018, participating in a crossover downloadable content for Tom Clancy's Ghost Recon: Wildlands and again in 2020 for Tom Clancy's Ghost Recon: Breakpoint. He was also added as a playable character in Tom Clancy's Rainbow Six: Siege, voiced by Jeff Teravainen.

Fictional biography

Sam Fisher (LCDR, USN-Ret.) is a former employee of Third Echelon, a top-secret black bag operation sub-branch within the National Security Agency (NSA) and a former member of its subsequent "Splinter Cell" program. Sam is currently the commander/head field operative of Fourth Echelon, a newly created covert special operations/counter-terrorism group that reports only to the President of the United States.

Early life and education
Samuel Leo Fisher was born on August 8, 1957, in the Baltimore suburb of Towson, Maryland. While not much is known of his childhood, it is known that Sam was raised by his paternel grandmother and attended a military boarding school after the death of his parents when he was a child until being accepted into the United States Naval Academy, where he graduated with a bachelor's degree in Political Science and was commissioned as an ensign in the U.S. Navy. Soon after, his personnel file was flagged for recruitment by the Navy SEALs, which he joined after passing their grueling selection process and training program.

In the mid-1980s, while Fisher was attached to the CIA (though still on active duty with the Navy) and working under an official diplomatic cover in Georgia (at the time part of the USSR), he met an NSA crypt-analyst named Regan Burns and they were married in a small ceremony at Rhein-Main Air Base in Frankfurt, Germany, after learning that Regan was pregnant with their child. On May 31, 1985, Regan gave birth to the couple’s only child, a daughter whom they named Sarah. Fisher and Regan divorced after three years of marriage, and after gaining custody of Sarah, Regan reverted to her maiden name and changed Sarah's as well. When Regan died from ovarian cancer sometime in 2000, Fisher gained guardianship of Sarah, moved back to the U.S. and took a job with the CIA, where he worked in weapons development as well as studied experimental weaponry and information warfare, in order to spend more time with her and focus on her upbringing.

Third Echelon Conspiracy/D.C. EMP Event
While Fisher was on a mission in Iceland, he was informed that Sarah was allegedly killed by a drunk driver in late 2007 or early 2008; however, three years later, he heard a rumor that her death was no accident and went to Malta to investigate. After being captured by Third Echelon in Malta, Grim revealed that Sarah is alive but if Sam wanted to see his daughter again he had to help her investigate Tom Reed. At Third Echelon HQ, Grim played a recording that Lambert made before his death in New York explaining that Sarah's death was faked to prevent her from being used as leverage by a mole inside Third Echelon to compromise Sam and the agency. After learning of this revelation, Sam reluctantly continued to help Grim in stopping Reed from assassinating the President of the United States, all the while reuniting with his daughter and retiring from government work.

Fourth Echelon and the Blacklist attack 
Bored with civilian life, Fisher accepts a job from his old associate and best friend, Victor Coste at Paladin Nine Security which specialized at high-tech defense solutions and kidnapping recovery work. But when Coste is injured during the Blacklist attack at Anderson Air Base in Guam, he is then offered by President Patricia Caldwell the position of commander of Fourth Echelon, which consisted of himself, alongside civilian hacker Charlie Cole, former CIA officer Isaac Briggs and lastly his co-worker at Third Echelon, Anna Grimsdottir.

Relationships
Sam's direct supervisor and handler in Third Echelon was Irving Lambert (Colonel, USA-Ret.) (deceased, 2008), who maintained constant radio contact with Sam during his missions, providing him with updates and support, and was even one of Fisher's oldest and closest friends. Assisting Lambert were several other Third Echelon employees who provided additional reconnaissance, logistical, and technical support to Sam while operating in the field: Vernon 'Junior' Wilkes (deceased), Anna Grímsdóttir, Frances Coen and William Redding (introduced in Chaos Theory, reassigned sometime after Chaos Theory).

Another of Sam Fisher's oldest friends, Douglas Shetland (Major, USMC-Ret.), a former USMC Recon officer and the CEO of a private military corporation who plays a prominent role in the third game, Splinter Cell: Chaos Theory, established that Fisher had served with Shetland in Kuwait during the Gulf War (while Shetland's unit was operating alongside the Navy SEALs and became close friends while stationed aboard the ) shortly after Fisher rescues him from a hostage situation during the "East Timor" mission in the second game, Splinter Cell: Pandora Tomorrow, when Shetland asks, "Where are the rest of the SEALs?" to which Sam replies and establishing that he left the U.S. Navy Reserve in 1996 by saying "I came alone. Haven't been Navy for a decade." When the role of Shetland and his PMC, Displace International, in Chaos Theory becomes clear, Sam hunts him down and kills him on the roof of a bathhouse in Tokyo.

Victor 'Vic' Coste is another one of Sam Fisher's oldest and closest friends. The two served together in the Navy SEALs in Iraq during the Persian Gulf War in 1991. During their time in Iraq, Vic and Sam was part of a four-man Navy SEAL team that was ambushed by soldiers of the Iraqi Republican Guard during a routine foot patrol while traversing along the road leading into Baghdad. Two of the four men within the squad were killed in the ambush, Sam (the squad leader at the time) was captured, and Vic Coste was left for dead. Having disobeyed direct orders to hold position and wait for evacuation, Coste single-handedly fought his way through to Sam behind enemy lines and rescued him, despite being heavily outnumbered and outgunned. This is a debt which Sam has never forgotten and as a result, Vic is one of the only people that Sam trusts unconditionally, and often turns to him for covert assistance in the field.

Professional Profile
Sam is 178 cm (5 ft 10 in) tall, weighs 77 kg (170 pounds), has greying, brown-black hair and green eyes. He still has an athletic physique for a man in his early 60s. He was the first person to be recruited as a field agent of the "Splinter Cell" program, Third Echelon's top-secret black ops project. A highly decorated veteran of JSOC's DEVGRU, and the CIA's Special Activities Division, Fisher is a master in the art of stealth, having been trained in various undercover and covert infiltration tactics. He not only specializes in night-time combat but in close-quarters combat in urban warfare and fieldcraft-related skills as well. In addition, Sam is extremely proficient in tradecraft skills such as surveillance tactics, computer hacking, handling explosives and the use of nearly any conventional firearm ambidextrously. He is also a highly trained expert in various forms of martial arts but he far excels in the Israeli self-defense and combat system of Krav Maga. In Tom Clancy's Splinter Cell: Conviction, he utilized the Center Axis Relock, a modern shooting stance used in close-quarters combat and was invented by Paul Castle. However, in Tom Clancy's Splinter Cell: Blacklist, it also features his skills in Russian Systema & skills in using the karambit. The stunts in that game features martial artist Kevin Secours as the game’s stunt double.
Sam prefers to work alone in the field. Established from the novels, Sam is known to have command of a startling number of languages, including native English, Spanish, German, Russian, Korean, Chinese, Arabic, Burmese, Georgian, and Persian. While not on assignment or stationed at Fort Meade (while he was working for Third Echelon), Fisher resided in a townhouse in Towson and a farmhouse in rural Germantown, Maryland (according to the novelizations of the series). According to the 2013 graphic novel, Splinter Cell: Echoes (which takes place during the end of Conviction and before the events that happened at the beginning of Splinter Cell: Blacklist), Sam now resides in a two-story house in Falls Church, Virginia, where his daughter, who currently lives in Atlanta, Georgia, stayed with him for a while during the book before moving to New York. Sam's signature sidearm is the FN Five-seveN, which is also his preferred weapon of choice throughout the Splinter Cell franchise. During the "Washington Monument" level in Conviction, he retrieves the Five-seveN from Victor Coste, who refers to it as Sam's "favorite pistol".

Fisher has conducted operations all over the world: Bolivia, Canada, Cuba, the former East Germany, the Democratic Republic of Congo, mainland China, Iceland, Israel, East Timor, Indonesia, Guam, Japan, Kyrgyzstan, Russia, Ukraine, Turkey, Azerbaijan, Libya, Iraq, Iran, Afghanistan, North and South Korea, Mexico, Panama, Peru, Paraguay, Myanmar, Serbia (when it was part of Yugoslavia), Georgia, and France. He has also conducted operations inside the United States, in places such as Los Angeles International Airport, Denver International Airport, Sabine Pass, Chicago, Philadelphia, Fort Meade, New York City, New Orleans, Washington, D.C., Ellsworth Federal Penitentiary in Kansas and the CIA's headquarters in Langley, Virginia.

The novel version of Tom Clancy's Splinter Cell establishes that Sam hated his time in the CIA when he was working there in the mid-late 1980s, and that he mostly had official cover (i.e. he was a "diplomatic aide").

The "Bank" mission in Chaos Theory reveals that Fisher served in Panama during Operation Just Cause and was part of a CIA team that raided the same bank during the conflict searching for some of Manuel Noriega's drug money. Around the time the conflict in Panama ended in January 1990, Fisher was called back to active duty with the SEALs and deployed to the Iraqi Republic, where he spent the next several months leading up to the Gulf War "sleeping in a ditch on the road between Baghdad and Kuwait" prior to the Iraqi invasion of Kuwait in August 1990. He was already present once the Western military intervention by the U.S.-led coalition forces began at the beginning of the Gulf War itself in January 1991.

Personality
As a covert operative whose existence is completely deniable by the U.S. government, Fisher approaches his target objectives in a gruff, no-nonsense manner, but maintains a lighthearted relationship with his colleagues and even with his momentary hostages (even if he is going to kill them). Fisher has little patience for government bureaucracy or behind-the-scenes political maneuvering. A realist who is well aware of the overarching political ramifications behind his assignments and the specific manner authorized for their completion, Fisher maintains a cynical, jaded and sarcastic sense of humor about the covert, illegal, and often morally ambiguous nature of his work. In Pandora Tomorrow, when Lambert informs Fisher that "Nobody knows whether he's (Norman Soth) a U.S. intelligence agent or a terrorist," Fisher replies that, "Those things aren't mutually exclusive."

At the same time, he is highly loyal and a staunch believer in the ideals his work ultimately protects. He is quickly angered by the casual and/or intentional slaughter of innocent civilians or unarmed military personnel by his enemies.

In the original Splinter Cell, Fisher is the original trial agent of the nascent Third Echelon initiative and its inaugural Splinter Cell program, and thus his interactions with his handler Colonel Lambert are relatively straightforward but respectful. At the same time, Fisher does drop the occasional sarcastic wisecrack at particularly unusual or obtuse instructions. For instance, during the final level in Pandora Tomorrow, Sam is in an elevator that shuts down when his enemies cut the power. Lambert informs him that the elevator has stopped, and Sam retorts with a sarcastic, "Thanks, Lambert."

In Splinter Cell: Chaos Theory, Fisher is blunt, and he appears fairly disappointed when Lambert orders him to avoid enemy fatalities as part of his mission parameters. Frequently holding captured enemies at knife-point, his dialog with them is creative and highly intimidating, though often morbidly humorous to the audience. In Splinter Cell: Conviction, Fisher's personality takes a leap towards ruthlessness. The intimidating threats of lethal force in Chaos Theory become standard practice. Fisher often tortures his subjects of interrogation through creative use of surrounding objects such pianos, fire extinguishers or windowsills.

The tie-in novels expand on Fisher's character. They portray him as detached and preferring solitude, buying non-perishables (such as any CDs he wants) online, and living by himself. The first novel explained in a one-sentence paragraph that Fisher "like[s] it that way." He avoids relationships due to the demands of his job, though he eventually engages in a relationship with his Krav Maga instructor Katia in Operation Barracuda but Katia is killed by a sniper shot that was meant for him. However, he does have a close relationship with his daughter, Sarah, which is used to bait him into a trap in the first novel when Sarah is kidnapped in order to get to Fisher.

In the novels, Fisher also mentions that he has the ability to fall asleep on command, unlike most people who can only sleep when tired. This, he says, is an asset in his line of work, which often requires him to obtain sleep in the most awkward of places.

Appearances
Games
Tom Clancy's Splinter Cell (2002)
Tom Clancy's Splinter Cell: Pandora Tomorrow (2004)
Tom Clancy's Splinter Cell: Chaos Theory (2005)
Tom Clancy's Splinter Cell: Essentials (2006)
Tom Clancy's Splinter Cell: Double Agent (2006)
Academy of Champions: Soccer (2009)
Tom Clancy's Splinter Cell: Conviction (2010)
Tom Clancy's Splinter Cell: Blacklist (2013)
Tom Clancy's Ghost Recon: Wildlands (2018)
Far Cry New Dawn (2019) (via easter egg)
Tom Clancy's Ghost Recon: Breakpoint (2020)
Tom Clancy's Rainbow Six Siege (2015)
Tom Clancy's Elite Squad (2020)

Novels
 Tom Clancy's Splinter Cell (2004) by David Michaels
 Tom Clancy's Splinter Cell: Operation Barracuda (2005) by David Michaels
 Tom Clancy's Splinter Cell: Checkmate (2006) by David Michaels
 Tom Clancy's Splinter Cell: Fallout (2007) by David Michaels
 Tom Clancy's Splinter Cell: Conviction (2009) by David Michaels
 Tom Clancy's Splinter Cell: Endgame (2009) by David Michaels
 Tom Clancy's Splinter Cell: Blacklist Aftermath (2013) by Peter Telep

Music
 Splinter Cell: Conviction: Original Soundtrack (Limited Collector's Edition) (2010)
 Agent Sam Fisher - Conviction (2008)
 Agent Sam Fisher - Double Agent (2007)

Reception
The character Sam Fisher received critical acclaim, being hailed as one of the biggest characters on Xbox and one of the console's synonyms in 2002, with praise going to the characterization used by Microsoft Game Studios and Ubisoft. In 2008, The Age ranked Fisher as the seventh greatest Xbox character of all time, stating "he's a man of action rather than words and a lone wolf, and sometimes, you've just got to respect that." On the other hand, PC Zone staff listed Fisher as the eighth worst character in PC gaming history, declaring "Once a great, iconic character - now one in freefall due to a genuine lack of imagination on the part of his creators." Text of this critique targets Splinter Cell: Double Agent.

In 2010, Game Informer'''s readers voted for Fisher as the twelfth top character of the 2000s decade. Although Fisher ultimately did not make the cut, Game Informer staff considered his inclusion in their "30 characters that defined a decade" collection, with Bryan Vore saying, "Before Splinter Cell ... it was easy to assume that Sam Fisher was simply a poor man's Solid Snake. But [he] quickly won over gamers thanks to his quiet and deadly efficiency, gruff yet sarcastic demeanor, and the willingness to disobey orders that he doesn't believe in."

The 2011 Guinness World Records Gamer's Edition lists the character as the twenty-fourth most popular video game character. UGO Networks featured Fisher on their list of "The Coolest Helmets and Headgear in Video Games" at number 5, remarking he is "unrecognizable without" the three-eyed night vision goggles "perched on his forehead."

In 2012, GamesRadar ranked him as the 37th "most memorable, influential, and badass" protagonist in games, adding that, "He's voiced by Michael Ironside and he wears awesome night vision goggles. That's good enough, right? No? Fine. ... He's like Macgyver-meets-James Bond-meets-Batman." Since then, this list has been updated annually.

In 2013, Complex ranked Sam Fisher at number 18 on the list of the greatest soldiers in video games, calling him "a little bit like an American James Bond—only without all the things that James Bond does besides kill dudes."

In 2016, Glixel'' staff ranked Fisher the 19th most iconic video game character of the 21st century, and a conversation he has with his handler following the optional rescue of two allies in Chaos Theory as the character's most "iconic moment".

References

Action-adventure game characters
Fictional assassins in video games
Fictional American people in video games
Fictional characters from Baltimore
Fictional double agents
Fictional Gulf War veterans
Fictional knife-fighters
Fictional lieutenant commanders
Fictional National Security Agency personnel
Fictional prison escapees
Fictional private military members
Fictional spymasters
Fictional sleeper agents
Fictional agent handlers and case officers
Fictional Krav Maga practitioners
Fictional eskrimadors
Fictional Systema practitioners
Fictional jujutsuka
Fictional Pencak Silat practitioners
Fictional torturers and interrogators
Fictional United States invasion of Panama veterans
Fictional United States Navy SEALs personnel
Male characters in video games
Fictional intelligence analysts
Fictional martial artists in video games
Fictional military personnel in video games
Fictional secret agents and spies in video games
Fictional soldiers in video games
Tom Clancy characters
Tom Clancy's Splinter Cell
Ubisoft characters
Video game characters introduced in 2002
Video game mascots
Video game protagonists